Rahul Vijay is an Indian actor who predominantly works in the Telugu films.

Early life 
Rahul was born to Vijay (stunt master).

Career 
Rahul made his film debut with the romantic drama Ee Maaya Peremito (2018). His next film was the female-centric Suryakantham (2019). In a review of the film by The Times of India, the reviewer wrote, "Rahul Vijay as Abhi seems to have improved from his previous film and brings honesty to his character". Rahul went on to star in the Tamil and Telugu remakes of College Kumar, a Kannada movie. He is currently preparing for his next film Panchathantram, a drama movie written and directed by Harsha Pulipaka and started shooting for his next collaborating with Megha Akash and Sushanth Reddy for the second time after Dear Megha.

Filmography

References

External links 

Living people
Year of birth missing (living people)
21st-century Indian male actors
Telugu male actors
Male actors in Telugu cinema
Indian male film actors